Maulana Naeem Siddiqui (1916 – 25 September 2002) was a Pakistani Islamic scholar, writer and politician. He was among the founder-members of the Jamaat-e-Islami and a close associate of Abul A'la Maududi and Amin Ahsan Islahi.

Early life and career
Naeem Siddiqui was born on 5 June 1916 at Chakwal, Punjab, British India. He was home-schooled and then from Government High School, Khanpur. He completed Molvi Faazil at Uloom-e-Islamia (institution for Islamic religious sciences) and then got the degrees of "Munshi" (Graduation) and of Munshi Faazil (that was equivalent to master's degree at that time) in Arabic and Persian literature from the University of Punjab, Lahore in 1938. Naeem Siddiqui was among the founder members of Jamaat-e-Islami along with its founder Abul A'la Maududi. However, due to irreconcilable differences with its leadership, he quit Jamaat in 1994 and founded the Islamic religious and political party tehreek e Islami along with his fellows in 1994. In 1996, Tehreek-e-Islami split into two groups, one group was led by Naeem Siddiqui himself while the coordinator of the other group was Hafeez-ur-Rehman Ahsan. Due to the endavour and mediation of some Arab-countries-based Pakistani friends, both groups were re-united in 1998.  He explained the story of the reunion in a letter to his friend Khwaja Maqbool Ellahi in 2001 by saying that our difference was unique and now our union is also very unique.

Contributions

Literature

Siddiqui started his literary career by joining biweekly magazine, Kausar, from Karachi under the editorship of Nasrullah Khan Aziz. Later, he joined the monthly Charagh-i-Rah and remained its editor for nine years. He was instrumental in using the above outlets to disseminate Islamic knowledge and raise awareness on Islamic culture.

He was credited as a poet of a unique style and wrote verses on religious, political and social issues. Through his short stories, poetry and articles in magazines such as the Charagh-i-Rah, he helped in creating a wide audience for Islamic literature and poetry in Pakistan and the Muslim world.

He was also editor of the monthly magazine Tarjuman-ul-Quran for a long time after the death of Maulana Maududi.

Books

Siddiqui is well-known for his biographical work on Islamic prophet Muhammad, Muhsin-e-Insaniyat, or The Benefactor of Humanity. This book describes and explains various stages of prophetic revolution. Furthermore, he is also the author of many books dealing with issues related to the socio-politico-economics system of Islam.

His famous books in Urdu language are: 
 Taleem Ka Tehzeebi Nazria
Aworat Ma'raz e Kashmakash Mein
 Ma'reka-e-Deen-o-Siasat
 Ta'meer e Sirat ke Lawazim
 Communism ya Islam
 Islami Socialism ke Nahin?
 Shola' Nawai Iqbal
 Al-Maududi
 Tehreek-e-Islami ka ebtedaaye Daur
 Islami Eqtesaadiyaat mein Enfiradiat aur Ejtema'yyat
 Islam aur Mutaaliba-e-Haq
 Eqamat e Deen aur Dolat Parast Mua'shera
 Tehreeki Sha'or
 Eshq e Rasool ke Haqeeqi Taqazay
 Daawat-e-Fikr-o-Amal
 Daawat-e-Islami ke Bunyadi Usool
 Fikr-o-Nazr
 Ma'roof-o-Munkar
 Tehreek-e-Fikr-e-Maududi
 Maujooda Jamat-e-Islami se Syed Maududi ke Jamat-e-Islami tak
 Tehreek e Islami ka Khaaka
 Tehreek eIslami ka Ta'aruf
 Tehreek e Islami ka Qiyaam Kiyuun?
 Pachpan Saala Rafaaqat 
 Tehreek e Islami – Doosri ejtema'ee  Tehreekon ke Muqaabil
 Tehreek e Islami ko Kaisay Nojawan Darkaar Hain
 Islami Tehreekein aur Chund Paecheedgiyaa'n

Along with his published books, almost all his more than 700 research articles on the matter of  socio-politico-economic system of Islam are published in various journals such as the monthly Tarjuman-ul-Quran, monthly  Siyaraa, monthly Chiraagh-e-Raah, bimonthly Na'shur, weekly Takbeer, weekly Shahab, weekly Asia and weekly Tasneem.

Death
Siddiqui died on 25 September 2002 in Lahore due to ill health at the age of 86. His funeral prayers were offered at the Mansoora Ground. It was led by Mian Tufail Mohammad, former Emir of the Jamaat-e-Islami.

References

1916 births
2002 deaths
Jamaat-e-Islami Pakistan politicians
Pakistani political party founders
Pakistani Sunni Muslim scholars of Islam
Urdu-language non-fiction writers
Islamic democracy activists
20th-century Muslim scholars of Islam